The 1994/95 FIS Nordic Combined World Cup was the 12th world cup season, a combination of ski jumping and cross-country skiing organized by FIS. It started on 29 Nov 1994 in Steamboat Springs, United States and ended on 25 March 1995 in Sapporo, Japan.

Calendar

Men

Standings

Overall 

Standings after 10 events.

Nations Cup 

Standings after 10 events.

References

External links
FIS Nordic Combined World Cup 1994/95 

1994 in Nordic combined
1995 in Nordic combined
FIS Nordic Combined World Cup